The 2016–17 American Eagles women's basketball team represented American University during the 2016–17 NCAA Division I women's basketball season. The Eagles, led by fourth year head coach Megan Gebbia, played their home games at Bender Arena and were members of the Patriot League. They finished the season 15–16, 11–7 in Patriot League play to finish in a tie for fourth place. They advanced to the semifinals of the Patriot League women's tournament where they lost to Bucknell.

Roster

Schedule

|-
!colspan=9 style="background:#0000FF; color:#CC0000;"| Non-conference regular season

|-
!colspan=9 style="background:#0000FF; color:#CC0000;"| Patriot League regular season

|-
!colspan=9 style="background:#0000FF; color:#CC0000;"| Patriot League Women's Tournament

See also
 2016–17 American Eagles men's basketball team

References

American
American Eagles women's basketball seasons
American Eagles women's basketball
American Eagles women's basketball